The following is a list of Loyola Greyhounds men's basketball head coaches. There have been 21 head coaches of the Greyhounds in their 113-season history.

Loyola's current head coach is Tavaras Hardy. He was hired as the Greyhounds' head coach in March 2018, replacing G. G. Smith, who resigned after the 2017–18 season.

References

Loyola Maryland

Loyola Greyhounds basketball, men's, coaches